Ondrej Prokop (born 11 August 1981) is a Slovak former professional ice hockey player who played with HC Slovan Bratislava in the Slovak Extraliga.

References

Living people
HC Slovan Bratislava players
Place of birth missing (living people)
Slovak ice hockey forwards
Slovak expatriate ice hockey players in Russia
Slovak expatriate ice hockey players in the United States
Slovak expatriate sportspeople in France
Slovak expatriate sportspeople in Spain
Slovak expatriate sportspeople in Poland
Expatriate ice hockey players in France
Expatriate ice hockey players in Spain
Expatriate ice hockey players in Poland
MKS Cracovia (ice hockey) players
Cedar Rapids RoughRiders players
Rochester Mustangs players
Molot-Prikamye Perm players
Ducs de Dijon players
1981 births